Attention is a 1946 Bollywood film.

References

External links
 

1946 films
1940s Hindi-language films
Indian action films
1940s action films
Indian black-and-white films
Hindi-language action films